Events from the year 1745 in Wales.

Incumbents

Lord Lieutenant of North Wales (Lord Lieutenant of Anglesey, Caernarvonshire, Denbighshire, Flintshire, Merionethshire, Montgomeryshire) – George Cholmondeley, 3rd Earl of Cholmondeley 
Lord Lieutenant of Glamorgan – Charles Powlett, 3rd Duke of Bolton
Lord Lieutenant of Brecknockshire and Lord Lieutenant of Monmouthshire – Thomas Morgan
Lord Lieutenant of Cardiganshire – Wilmot Vaughan, 3rd Viscount Lisburne
Lord Lieutenant of Carmarthenshire – vacant until 1755
Lord Lieutenant of Pembrokeshire – Sir Arthur Owen, 3rd Baronet
Lord Lieutenant of Radnorshire – vacant

Bishop of Bangor – Matthew Hutton
Bishop of Llandaff – John Gilbert
Bishop of St Asaph – Samuel Lisle
Bishop of St Davids – The Hon. Richard Trevor

Events
Following the failure of the Jacobite Rebellion, Sir Watkin Williams-Wynn, 3rd Baronet, is suspected of involvement and seeks protection from his father-in-law, Charles Noel Somerset, 4th Duke of Beaufort.

Arts and literature

New books
Anonymous
An Expostulatory Epistle to the Welsh Knight..., etc
An Apology for the Welsh Knight..., etc

Music
Ancient British Music, Part 2 (unpublisher)

Births
13 January - Robert Jones, Rhoslan, writer (died 1829)
14 February - David Davis (Castellhywel), poet (died 1827)
15 July - Sir John Morris, 1st Baronet, industrialist (died 1819)
date unknown - Thomas Redmond, artist (died 1785)

Deaths
22 October - William Herbert, 2nd Marquess of Powis, 80
date unknown - Erasmus Lewes, Anglican clergyman

References

1745 by country
1745 in Great Britain